Matthew Kluzek (born 3 April 1973) is a former professional Australian rules footballer who played with the Adelaide Football Club in the Australian Football League (AFL).

Kluzek came to the Adelaide Football Club from the 1994 Pre-Season draft, having previously been drafted by Melbourne. He was used a small forward and earned a nomination for the 1994 AFL Rising Star award after kicking five goals in Adelaide's round 17 win over the West Coast Eagles at Football Park. Kluzek played 13 games in the 1995 AFL season but appeared just four times in 1996.

A premiership player with Woodville-West Torrens, Kluzek made a total of 185 SANFL appearances.

Kluzek coached Scotch Old Collegians in the South Australian Amateur Football League from 2002 to 2004 and returned to the club as coach for the 2011 season.

References

1973 births
Australian rules footballers from South Australia
Adelaide Football Club players
Woodville-West Torrens Football Club players
Living people